Ghetto fabulous is a fashion stereotype alluding to individuals living in an affluent materialistic style while not always having any luxurious possessions or wealth.

Ghetto Fabulous may also refer to:

 Ghetto Fabulous (album), a 1998 album by Mystikal
 "Ghetto Fabulous" (song), a 1998 song by Ras Kass
 Ghetto Fabulous, a dance troupe that appeared on The All Ireland Talent Show

See also
Ghetto Fabolous, the 2001 debut album by Fabolous